Jaco is a 2014 American documentary that depicts the life and death of jazz musician Jaco Pastorius. The film was directed by Paul Marchand and Stephen Kijak and produced by Robert Trujillo of Metallica and John Battsek of Passion Pictures.

The film features interviews with Herbie Hancock, Wayne Shorter, Sting, Joni Mitchell, Carlos Santana, Jerry Jemmott, Jonas Hellborg, Bootsy Collins, and Flea.

Reception
The New York Times called Jaco "an illuminating, compassionate new documentary." Decider pronounced it "an engaging and interesting documentary" albeit about a "musician’s musician" which could limit its appeal. Bassist Billy Sheehan felt that it was "a wonderful film" but opined that "I think, maybe, it might have concentrated on some eccentricities a little bit more than it could have."

References

External links
Jaco. The movie can be seen for free on Tubi.
 
 Metallica's Robert Trujillo On His Hero, Jaco Pastorius

2014 films
American documentary films
Documentary films about jazz music and musicians
Films produced by John Battsek
2010s English-language films
2010s American films